Wurst may refer to:

The ground (minced) meat product sausage
The KMFDM compilation album Würst, released in 2010
Conchita Wurst